Thomas J. Buckley (February 3, 1895 – September 9, 1964) was an American politician who served as Massachusetts Auditor from 1941 to 1964.

Buckley died of a heart attack on the day before the 1964 primary election.

Buckley was not a relative of Thomas H. Buckley, who also served as Massachusetts Auditor (1935–1939).

Bibliography
 Hayden, Irving N. 1955–1956 Public officers of the Commonwealth of Massachusetts, p. 27, (1955).
 Hayden, Irving N. 1961–1962 Public officers of the Commonwealth of Massachusetts, p. 27, (1961).

References

 

1895 births
1964 deaths
State auditors of Massachusetts
People from East Boston, Boston
20th-century American politicians